Love, Honor and Goodbye is a 1945 American comedy film directed by Albert S. Rogell and written by Arthur Phillips, Lee Loeb and Dick Irving Hyland. The film stars Virginia Bruce, Edward Ashley, Victor McLaglen, Nils Asther, Helen Broderick and Veda Ann Borg. The film was released on September 15, 1945, by Republic Pictures.

Plot

Roberta Baxter wants to be an actress. Without telling her, husband Bill financially backs a stage play she's been cast in, secretly hoping for a flop so that Roberta will give up acting and return home.

Getting his wish, the play flops. Bill's scheme, however, is revealed to Roberta by theater director Tony Linnard, who wants her (and her money) for his next production. Bill blurts out that Roberta is not a talented actress, causing her to demand a divorce.

Unbeknownst to anyone else, Bill has begun looking after a young girl, Sally, at the request of her father, a struggling tattoo artist who is away seeking suitable employment. Roberta mistakenly believes her husband has a mistress with a child. She disguises herself as a governess called Fleurette and is hired, unaware that Bill has recognized her.

Roberta develops affection for the child, but then Terry returns and he, too, believes Bill has taken up with another woman. The complications are eventually resolved, and when Fleurette is revealed to be Roberta in disguise, Bill compliments her on what a fine actress she is.

Cast  
Virginia Bruce as Roberta Baxter
Edward Ashley as William Baxter
Victor McLaglen as Terry O'Farrell
Nils Asther as Tony Linnard
Helen Broderick as Mary Riley
Veda Ann Borg as Marge
Jacqueline Moore as Sally
Robert Greig as Charles
Victoria Horne as Miss Whipple
Ralph Dunn as Detective
Therese Lyon as Miss Hopkins

References

External links 
 

1945 films
1940s English-language films
American comedy films
1945 comedy films
Republic Pictures films
Films directed by Albert S. Rogell
American black-and-white films
1940s American films